The 1975 All-Ireland Senior Ladies' Football Championship was won by Tipperary.

Results

Connacht
Galway defeated Roscommon in the final.

Leinster

Munster
Played on a league system.
6 July: Kerry 2-9 Cork 0-3 (Castleisland)
20 July: Kerry 4-8 Waterford 2-2 (Dungarvan)
17 August: Tipperary 7-3 Kerry 1-5 (Fitzgerald Stadium, Killarney)

Ulster

All-Ireland

References

External links

Ladies' Football Championship